Dual Independent Map Encoding (DIME) is an encoding scheme developed by the US Bureau of the Census for efficiently storing geographical data. The committee behind the case study that eventually resulted in DIME was established in 1965, although the term DIME itself was first coined by George Farnsworth in August 1967. The file format developed for storing the DIME-encoded data was known as Geographic Base Files (GBF). The Census Bureau replaced the data format with Topologically Integrated Geographic Encoding and Referencing (TIGER) in 1990.

See also 
Geographic information system

External links 
A short story of DIME
What is GIS (corporate backed web site)

GIS file formats